The following highways are numbered 679:

Canada

United States